Joseph Fielding McConkie (April 3, 1941 – October 10, 2013) was a professor of Ancient Scripture at Brigham Young University (BYU) and an author or co-author of over 25 books.

McConkie was a member of the Church of Jesus Christ of Latter-day Saints (LDS Church) and the son of Bruce R. McConkie and Amelia Smith McConkie. In 1966, he married Brenda Kempton in the Salt Lake Temple.

McConkie was born in Salt Lake City, Utah and graduated from Olympus High School in 1959, received a Doctorate of Education from BYU in 1973 and was an LDS Chaplain in Vietnam. He served in many capacities in the LDS Church, including as president of the Scotland Edinburgh Mission from 1989 to 1992. He also served as president of a student stake at BYU and was an Institute Director in Seattle, Washington.

Before retiring, McConkie taught at BYU as a Professor of Ancient Scripture in the College of Religious Education.

Works
Many of McConkie's books primarily address Joseph of Egypt, Joseph Smith, the Book of Mormon, and the revelations of the restoration.
He said his book Between the Lines is an attempt to correct some misreadings of scripture.

Books

 The Church of Jesus Christ of Latter-day Saints and the Reorganized Church of Jesus Christ of Latter Day Saints on Four Distinctive Aspects of Deity as Taught by Joseph Smith. Brigham Young University Master Thesis (1968)
 True and Faithful, The Life Story of Joseph Fielding Smith. Bookcraft (1971)
 Teach and Reach. Bookcraft (1975)
 Journal of Discourses Digest, Volume 1. Bookcraft (1975)
 Seeking the Spirit. Deseret Book (1978)
 En Busca Del Don Celestial—In Search of the Spirit (Spanish). Deseret Book (2006)
 His Name Shall Be Joseph, "Ancient Prophecies of the Latter-day Seer". Hawkes Publishing, Inc. (1980)
 The Spirit of Revelation. Deseret Book (1984)
 Hearken, O Ye People, Discourses on the Doctrine and Covenants, Sperry Symposium 1984. editor. Randall Book (1984)
 Sustaining and Defending the Faith. co-authored with Robert L. Millet. Deseret Book (1985)
 Gospel Symbolism. Deseret Book (1985)
 The Life Beyond. co-authored with Robert L. Millet. Deseret Book (1986)
 Doctrinal Commentary on the Book of Mormon, Volume 1 - First and Second Nephi. co-authored with Robert L. Millet. Bookcraft (1987)
 Doctrinal Commentary on the Book of Mormon, Volume 2 - Jacob through Mosiah. co-authored with Robert L. Millet. Bookcraft (1988)
 Prophets and Prophecy. Bookcraft (1988)
 In His Holy Name. co-authored with Robert L. Millet. Bookcraft (1988)
 Truth and Courage: Joseph F. Smith Letters, editor. privately published by 1988 Joseph F. Smith Family Trustees and Officers (1988)
 The Holy Ghost. co-authored with Robert L. Millet. Bookcraft (1989)
 The Man Adam. co-edited with Robert L. Millet. Bookcraft (1990)
 A Guide to Scriptural Symbols. co-authored with Donald W. Parry. Bookcraft (1990)
 Doctrinal Commentary on the Book of Mormon, Volume 3 - Alma through Helaman. co-authored with Robert L. Millet. Bookcraft (1991)
 Doctrinal Commentary on the Book of Mormon, Volume 4 - Third Nephi through Mormon. co-authored with Robert L. Millet and Brent L. Top. Bookcraft (1992)
 Our Destiny The Call and Election of the House of Israel. co-authored with Robert L. Millet. Deseret Book (1993)
 Sons and Daughters of God: The Loss and Restoration of Our Divine Inheritance. Bookcraft (1994)
 Here We Stand. Deseret Book (1995)
 Joseph Smith, The Choice Seer: The Prophet's Greatness as Teacher, Priesthood Leader, and Restorer. co-authored by Robert L. Millet. Bookcraft (1996)
 Answers: Straightforward Answers to Tough Gospel Questions. Deseret Book (1998) 
 Witnesses of the Birth of Christ. Bookcraft (1998) 
 Revelations of the Restoration: A Commentary on the Doctrine & Covenants & Other Modern Revelations. co-authored with Craig J. Ostler. Deseret Book (2000) 
 The Bruce R. McConkie Story: Reflections of a Son. Deseret Book (2003) 
 Understanding the Power God Gives Us. Deseret Book (2004) 
 The Smith Family: A Tradition of Revelation. Self-published (Christmas 2005)
 Between the Lines: Unlocking Scripture with Timeless Principles. Digital Legend (2009) 
 Valiant in the Testimony of Christ. Digital Legend (2009) 
 Christ, Covenants, & Salvation. Ben Haven Books (2010) 
 50 Truths the devil doesn't want you to know. Ben Haven Books (2013) 
 Defending the Sanctity of Marriage. Ben Haven Books (2014) 

Columns

McConkie contributed columns to Meridian Magazine and  LDS Living:
Mary and Elisabeth: Handmaidens of the Lord
 What Was It Like to Have Bruce R. McConkie as Your Father?
Political and Religious Freedom: Understanding the Power God Gives Us 
 Questions Commonly Asked By Those Not of Our Faith
 From Father to Son: Joseph F. McConkie on Gospel Teaching
 Joseph Smith and the One True Church Doctrine

Talks

Some of McConkie's talks and lessons:
Finding Answers, BYU Devotional, 12 December 2006:  video,  audio,  transcript
The How of Scripture Study, BYU Education Week, 23 August 2006:  video,  audio
The Smith Family and a Tradition of Revelation, Sperry Symposium, 28 October 2005:  audio
The Prophet Joseph Smith: Revealer of Truth, BYU Education Week, 15 August 2005:  video,   audio
Joseph Smith as Known to Isaiah, BYU-I Devotional, 12 October 2004:  audio
Agency, Ricks College Devotional, 9 November 1999:  audio
The Prophet Joseph Smith: Evidences of His Testimony, BYU Education Week, 16 August 1999:  audio
President Joseph F. Smith's Panoramic Vision: Doctrine & Covenants 138, BYU Education Week, 18 August 1997:  audio
Recently interviewed on the topic of LDS scriptural interpretation and doctrine, on the LDS sponsored podcast "Mormon Identities," by Eric Huntsman (part 1  and part 2 .)

Notes

References

 Deseret Book Author Listing

1941 births
2013 deaths
20th-century Mormon missionaries
American Latter Day Saint writers
American leaders of the Church of Jesus Christ of Latter-day Saints
American military chaplains
American Mormon missionaries in Scotland
Brigham Young University alumni
Brigham Young University faculty
McConkie family
Military personnel from Salt Lake City
Mission presidents (LDS Church)
Smith family (Latter Day Saints)
Vietnam War chaplains
Latter Day Saints from Utah
Latter Day Saints from Washington (state)
Writers from Salt Lake City